Defiance is the self-titled debut EP by the American anarcho street punk band Defiance, released on Consensus Reality Records on 1994.

Track listing 
A side
Too Close to Being Over – 2:18
Affect Change – 2:29

B side
Fodder – 2:50
Burn – 4:10

Defiance (punk band) albums
1994 EPs